Alexia Fast (born 12 September 1992) is a Canadian actress who began her career at the age of seven when she wrote, directed and starred in the short film The Red Bridge, which premiered at the 2002 Atlantic and Reel to Reel Film Festivals. She obtained her first agent at the age of 11 and starred in her first feature film, Fido (2006), at 13.

Career
At the age of seven, Alexia Fast wrote, directed and starred in a short film entitled The Red Bridge. She starred in her first feature film, Fido (2006), after gaining her first agent at the age of 11. She has appeared in a number of television films, feature films and in episodes of various television series. Fast played a role in Hungry Hills and Repeaters, both of which premiered at the Toronto International Film Festival. In 2010, she had a leading role in Triple Dog. In 2012, she had a supporting role in the film Jack Reacher.

Fast has won two Leo Awards, the first one 2007 in the category Best Lead Performance by a Female in a Feature Length Drama for her role in Past Tense and 2011 in the category Best Supporting Performance by a Female in a Feature Length Drama for Repeaters.

Filmography

Film

Television

References

External links

 

1992 births
Actresses from Vancouver
Canadian child actresses
Canadian film actresses
Canadian television actresses
Living people
21st-century Canadian actresses